Class II PI 3-kinases are a subgroup of the enzyme family, phosphoinositide 3-kinase that share a common protein domain structure, substrate specificity and method of activation.

Class II PI 3-kinases were the most recently identified class of PI 3-kinases.

There are three class II PI 3-kinase isoforms expressed in mammalian cells;
PI3K-C2α encoded by the PIK3C2A gene
PI3K-C2β encoded by the PIK3C2B gene
PI3K-C2γ encoded by the PIK3C2G gene

See also
 Phosphoinositide 3-kinase

References
Stein RC (2001) Prospects for phosphoinositide 3-kinase inhibition as a cancer treatment Endocr Relat Cancer 8:237-248 
Foster FM, Traer CJ, Abraham SM, and Fry MJ (2003) The phosphoinositide (PI) 3-kinase family J Cell Sci 116:3037-3040.
Vanhaesebroeck B, Waterfield MD.(1999) Signaling by distinct classes of phosphoinositide 3-kinases. Exp Cell Res. 253(1):239-54.

EC 2.7.1